The Nika Award for Best Film of the CIS and Baltic States is given annually by the Russian Academy of Cinema Arts and Science and presented at the Nika Awards.

In the following lists, the titles and names in bold with a light blue background are the winners and recipients respectively; those not in bold are the nominees.

Winners and nominees

2000s

2010s

2020s

Awards by nation

References

External links
 

Nika Awards
Film awards for Best Foreign Language Film
Lists of films by award